Foothill Ranch is a master planned community in Orange County, California, United States. The population was 10,899 at the 2000 census. Foothill Ranch was incorporated into the city of Lake Forest, California, in 2000. Prior to that, it was a census-designated place.

Foothill Ranch is notable for a few companies such as Oakley, Inc., Nike, Kaiser Aluminum, Kawasaki, TAE Technologies, and ProBoards. It is also the home of Saddleback Church.

Geography 
The ZIP Code for Foothill Ranch is 92610.

Demographics 
As of the census of 2000, there were 10,899 people, 3,816 households, and 2,976 families residing in the CDP. The population density was 3,858.8 inhabitants per square mile (1,492.2/km2). The racial makeup of the CDP was 74.38% White, 1.92% Black or African American, 0.29% Native American, 14.96% Asian, 0.28% Pacific Islander, 3.38% from other races, and 4.78% from two or more races.  10.85% of the population were Hispanic or Latino of any race.

There were 3,816 households, out of which 49.9% had children under the age of 18 living with them, 69.2% were married couples living together, 5.9% had a female householder with no husband present, and 22.0% were non-families. 16.3% of all households were made up of individuals, and 0.7% had someone living alone who was 65 years of age or older. The average household size was 2.86 and the average family size was 3.27.

In the CDP, the population was spread out, with 31.5% under the age of 18, 4.1% from 18 to 24, 47.5% from 25 to 44, 14.6% from 45 to 64, and 2.3% who were 65 years of age or older. The median age was 32 years. For every 100 females, there were 99.5 males.  For every 100 females age 18 and over, there were 96.9 males.

The median income for a household in the CDP was $89,038, and the median income for a family was $97,897. Males had a median income of $67,791 versus $41,786 for females. The per capita income for the CDP was $36,013. About 1.4% of families and 1.6% of the population were below the poverty line, including 2.0% of those under age 18 and none of those age 65 or over. Foothill Ranch was completed in 1996 and was annexed to Lake Forest in 2000.

Politics 
In the state legislature, Foothill Ranch is located in the 37th Senate District, represented by Democrat David Min, and in the 70th Assembly District, represented by Republican Donald P. Wagner.

References

External links 
 Foothill Ranch is the Home Owners Association web page for Foothill Ranch

Neighborhoods in Lake Forest, California
Former census-designated places in California